Samuel Dickinson Hubbard (August 10, 1799 – October 8, 1855) was a U.S. Representative from Connecticut and the 15th U.S. Postmaster General.

Early life
Samuel Dickinson Hubbard was born in Middletown, Connecticut. He pursued classical studies at Yale College and graduated in 1819. He practiced law from 1823 to 1837.

Career
He then found work in manufacturing, founding the Russell Manufacturing Company with Samuel Russell in 1834.

Hubbard later got involved in politics and in 1844 he was elected to the Twenty-ninth United States Congress and later reelected to the Thirtieth Congress from Connecticut's 2nd congressional district, serving from March 4, 1845, to March 3, 1849, both terms as a Whig.

In 1852, President Millard Fillmore appointed him United States Postmaster General serving from August 31, 1852, to March 7, 1853.

He was elected a member of the American Antiquarian Society in 1853.

Death
Hubbard died October 8, 1855, in Middletown, Connecticut. He is buried in Indian Hill Cemetery in Middletown with his wife Jane Miles Hubbard.

References

External links

Samuel Dickinson Hubbard at The Political Graveyard

1799 births
1855 deaths
Burials at Indian Hill Cemetery
United States Postmasters General
Connecticut lawyers
Yale College alumni
Fillmore administration cabinet members
Connecticut Whigs
Democratic Party members of the United States House of Representatives from Connecticut
Politicians from Middletown, Connecticut
Members of the American Antiquarian Society
19th-century American politicians